Elkhorn Ridge is a rugged ridge,  long, between Towle Glacier and Northwind Glacier in the Convoy Range of Victoria Land. It was mapped by the United States Geological Survey from ground surveys and Navy air photos, and was named by the Advisory Committee on Antarctic Names in 1964 for the USNS Elkhorn, a tanker in the American convoy into McMurdo Sound, 1961–62.

References 

Ridges of Victoria Land
Scott Coast